Events in the year 2022 in Greece.

Incumbents 

 President: Katerina Sakellaropoulou
 Prime Minister: Kyriakos Mitsotakis

Events 

 Ongoing: COVID-19 pandemic in Greece
 January 4 – Greece reports a record 50,126 new cases of COVID-19 in the past 24 hours, thereby bringing the nationwide total of confirmed cases to 1,344,923.
 January 9 – The Greek government announces that fully vaccinated people who have not received a COVID-19 vaccine booster dose seven months after receiving their second dose will be banned from entering most indoor venues and participating in many types of activities beginning on February 1.
 January 17 – Greece begins to introduce monthly fines for people over the age of 60 who are unvaccinated against COVID-19 amid an increase in the number of new cases in the country. The monthly fine will initially be €50 this month and will be €100 per month thereafter.
 February 18 – Eleven people are missing after a ferry travelling between Greece and Italy catches fire. 
 April 19 – Greece seizes Russian-flagged oil tanker Pegas/Lana off the island of Euboea as part of European Union economic sanctions on Russia. The ship had 19 crew members on board, according to the Ministry of Shipping.
 May 1 – The Greek Civil Aviation announces that Greece has lifted their COVID-19 restrictions for domestic and foreign flights. Passengers will still be required to wear a mask. 
 May 11 – Greece bans the practice of conversion therapy for minors as well as all advertisements promoting it.
 May 21 – Greece reports its first case of monkeypox.
 May 26 – The US seizes a Russian owned oil tanker carrying Iranian crude oil in Greece and has transferred the cargo to another ship destined for the US. It is unclear if the seizure was due to US sanctions against Iran or US sanctions on Russia.
 June 1 – Turkish President Recep Tayyip Erdoğan cancels high-level talks with Greek Prime Minister Kyriakos Mitsotakis, accusing Mitsotakis of consistently using Greek jets to violate Turkey's airspace. Turkish Foreign Affairs Minister Mevlüt Çavuşoğlu had also accused Greece of violating the airspace of demilitarized zones in the Aegean Sea yesterday.
 June 5 – A large wildfire breaks out on the Hymettus mountain range near Athens, Greece. A number of homes are damaged in the fire.
 July 11 – Two people are killed and four others are injured after a three car pileup caused by a pack of boars north of Thessaloniki.
 July 13 – Two firefighters are killed and two others survive after a helicopter crashes on the Greek island of Samos. 
 July 16 – An Antonov An-12 cargo plane, operated by a Ukrainian airline, crashes near the city of Kavala, Greece, killing all eight people on board. The aircraft was carrying weapons from Serbia to Bangladesh, and crashed before a planned stop in Jordan.
 July 23 – Nine people are rescued after wildfires burn on the island of Lesbos and threaten the resort town of Vatera amid a heat wave in the country.
 August 21 – In tennis, world number 156 Borna Ćorić of Croatia becomes the lowest-ranked champion in the ATP Tour Masters 1000 after defeating Stefanos Tsitsipas of Greece in the men's singles final of the 2022 Cincinnati Masters.
 September 3 – President of Turkey Recep Tayyip Erdoğan accuses Greece of "arming" and "occupying" the demilitarized Aegean islands, with Minister of Foreign Affairs Mevlüt Çavuşoğlu threatening to revoke recognition of Greek sovereignty over the islands if the alleged militarization is not halted.
 October 15 – 2022 Greek floods.

Deaths 

 4 January
 Andreas Michalopoulos, 73, footballer
 Stelios Serafidis, 86, footballer
 16 January – Alekos Fassianos, 86, painter
 3 February – Christos Sartzetakis, 92, politician
 16 February – Vasilios Botinos, 77, footballer
 22 February – Christos Angourakis, 69, athlete
 25 February – Dimitris Tsovolas, 79, politician
 27 February – Marietta Giannakou, 70, politician
 10 March – Dimitris Kontominas, 82, businessman
 17 March – Elsa Papadimitriou, 80, politician
 29 March – Irini Konitopoulou-Legaki, 90, singer
 12 April – Giorgos Katiforis, 87, lawyer
 25 April – Kostas Karapatis, 94, footballer
 6 May – Kostas Gousgounis, 91, pornographic actor
 8 May – Stefanos Petrakis, 97, Olympic sprinter
 17 May –Vangelis, 79, musician
 10 June – Sotirios Trambas, 92, prelate
 13 June – 
 Nikolaos Deligiorgis, 85, magazine editor
 Marina Lambraki-Plaka, 83, historian
 19 June – Thalis Tsirimokos, 62, footballer
 21 June – Nikos Salikas, 81, politician
 8 July – Athanasios Dimitrakopoulos, 86, politician
 16 July – Georgios Daskalakis, 86, politician
 2 August – Stavros Psycharis, 77, politician 
 7 August – Dionysis Simopoulos, 79, astronomer
 9 August – Dimitris Tsironis, 62, politician
 21 August – Robert Williams, 72, composer
 2 September – Georgios Kalamidas, 77, judge
 13 September – 
 Theophilos Kamberidis, 92, politician
 Kostas Kazakos, 87, actor
 Spiros Zournatzis, 86, journalist and politician
 14 September – 
 Dimitrios Pandermalis, 82, archaeologist
 Irene Papas, 93, actress
 18 September  – Martha Karagianni, 82, actress
 30 September – Zahos Hadjifotiou, 99, businessman
 1 October – Stamatis Kokotas, 85, singer
 2 October – Themis Katrios, 70, Greek basketball player
 13 October  – Stavros Sarafis, 72, football player

References 

 
2020s in Greece
Years of the 21st century in Greece
Greece
Greece